St Nicholas' Gaelic Football Club is a Cork-based Gaelic Athletic Association club based in the Ballyvolane and Blackpool areas of Cork city, Ireland.  The club was founded in 1901 and is solely concerned with the game of Gaelic football.  St Nick's are closely linked with their sister club Glen Rovers.

Gaelic football

Honours

Munster Senior Club Football Championships:
 Winner (1): 1967
Cork Senior Club Football Championships:
 Winner (5): 1938, 1941, 1954, 1965, 1966
 Runner-up (5): 1947, 1950, 1951, 1963, 1969
Cork Intermediate Football Championship
 Winner (2) 1917, 1937
 Cork Minor Football Championship
 Winner (15) 1926, 1927,  1932, 1933, 1945, 1947, 1951, 1952, 1958, 1969, 1976,  1979, 1980, 1987, 2002
 Cork Under-21 Football Championship
 Winner (1) 2003
 Kelleher Shield (SFL)
 Winner (5) 1963, 1964, 1965, 1966, 1970
 Cork City Junior Football Championship
 Winner (9) 1930, 1943, 1958, 1963, 1972, 1981, 1983, 1984, 1985

Famous players

 Graham Callinan
 Denis Coughlan
 Éamonn Goulding
 Jack Lynch
 John Lyons
 Tomás Mulcahy
 Teddy O'Brien
 Martin O'Doherty
 Donie O'Donovan
 Christy Ring
 Vincy Twomey
 Jackie Daly

External links
Cork GAA site
St Nicholas’s GAA website

Gaelic games clubs in County Cork
Gaelic football clubs in County Cork